The R725 is a Regional Route in South Africa.

Route
Its northern terminus is the R34/R57 at Heilbron. From there, it runs south to Lindley, ending at the R707.

References 

Regional Routes in the Free State (province)